is a city in Tottori Prefecture, Japan. , the city had an estimated population of 32,012 in 13178 households and a population density of 1110 persons per km².

Geography
Sakaiminato is located in far western Tottori Prefecture, at the northern end of the Yumigahama Peninsula. It is surrounded on three sides by Lake Nakaumi , the Sea of Japan, and the Sakai Channel that connects them. Across the Sakai Channel or across the Eshima Ohashi Bridge, it borders the city of Matsue in Shimane Prefecture. Sakaiminato is located on a sandbar, and the land is very flat with an average elevation of two meters above sea level.

Surrounding Municipalities 
Tottori Prefecture
 Yonago
Shimane Prefecture
 Matsue

Climate
Sakaiminato has a Humid climate (Köppen Cfa) characterized by warm, wet summers and cold winters with heavy snowfall.

Demography
Per Japanese census data, the population of Sakaiminato has been as follows.

Etymology
The name of Sakaiminato in the Japanese language is formed from two kanji characters. The first, means "border", and the second,  means "port".</ref>

History
The area of Sakaiminato was part of ancient Hōki Province and number remains from the Yayoi period and Kofun period have been found within city limits. In the Muromachi period, the area was dominated by the powerful Amago clan from Izumo Province and occupied an important position as a landing point for rice and navy anchorage. During the Sengoku period, it came under the control of the Mōri clan, and during the Edo Period, it was part of the holdings of the Ikeda clan of Tottori Domain. Following the Meiji restoration, the port prospered as a strategic point for domestic shipping routes in the Sea of Japan, and was designated as a trading port in 1896 for continental trade with Busan, Incheon, and Wonsan on the Korean Peninsula. The town of Sakai was established on October 21, 1889 with the establishment of the modern municipalities system. It was raised to city status on April 1, 1956, changing its name to Sakaiminato at that time.

Government
Sakaiminato has a mayor-council form of government with a directly elected mayor and a unicameral city council of 15 members. The current mayor of Sakaiminato is Kentarō Date, serving since July 25, 2020. The city council meets four times a year (March, June, September, and December) and special meetings take place if required. The mayor convenes the city council meetings, but the mayor must call a special meeting when requested by one-fourth or more of the fixed number of council members . The city council members are citizens who are at least 25 years of age, and are elected every four years. Sakaiminato contributes two members to the Tottori Prefectural Assembly.. In terms of national politics, the city is part of Tottori 2nd district of the lower house of the Diet of Japan.

Mayors 
 Minoru Adachi (September 5, 1954 -)
 Seiichirō Kashiwagi (September 5, 1966 -)
 Sadae Yasuda (September 5, 1978 - November 20, 1989)
 Tetsuo Kuromi (December 10, 1989 - June 5, 2004)
 Katsuji Nakamura (July 25, 2004 - July 24, 2020)
 Kentarō Date (July 25, 2020 -)

Economy

The seaport of Sakaiminato has a long history as a seaport for the San'in Region. Following World War II the city has served as the base of the fishing industry for all of Western Japan. Consequently, marine product processing is also a major industry in the city.

Education
Sakaiminato has six public elementary schools and three public junior high schools operated by the town government. The city has twoour public high schools operated by the Tottori Prefectural Board of Education.

Transportation

Airport
Miho-Yonago Airport

Railway 
 JR West - Sakai Line.
  -  -  -  -  -  -

Highways

Seaports
Port of Sakaiminato; The port at Sakaiminato serves the DBS Cruise ferry Eastern Dream, which connects Japan to Donghae, South Korea, and Vladivostok, Russia.

Twin towns – sister cities

Sakaiminato is twinned with:
 Hunchun, China

Former twin towns 
 Wonsan, North Korea (revoked in 2006) Sakaiminato was the only Japanese municipality to have a twin town agreement with a North Korean city from 1992 to 2006. In 2006, Mayor Katsuji Nakamura revoke the agreement in response to North Korea's announcement of a nuclear test along with the Japanese government's decision to impose economic sanctions. Actual twin town activities had already come to an end by 2002, after which the cities had only sent each other a letter once per year.

Local attractions
Tottori Domain Battery Sites, National Historic Site

Notable people from Sakaiminato
Shigeru Mizuki, the creator of GeGeGe no Kitaro, a character seen in many forms throughout Japan. The spirit of Kitaro can be found in Sakaiminato, on Kitaro Road, a street dedicated to all the characters that appear in Mizuki's stories. One hundred bronze statues of the story's characters line both sides of the road.
Shōji Ueda

Gallery

References

External links 

 Sakaiminato City official web site 
 Sakaiminato City official web site 

Cities in Tottori Prefecture
Port settlements in Japan
Populated coastal places in Japan
Sakaiminato, Tottori